Iris Zimmermann (born January 6, 1981) is an American fencer. She competed in the women's individual and team foil events at the 2000 Summer Olympics, and she won a bronze medal at the 1999 World Fencing Championships.

Her sister is Felicia Zimmermann, an Olympic fencer for the United States in 1996 and 2000. In 2009, the sisters purchased the Rochester Fencing Club in Rochester, New York.

References

External links
 

1981 births
Living people
American female foil fencers
Olympic fencers of the United States
Fencers at the 2000 Summer Olympics
Sportspeople from Rochester, New York
Pan American Games medalists in fencing
Pan American Games bronze medalists for the United States
Fencers at the 1999 Pan American Games
21st-century American women